Maccabi Neve Sha'anan Eldad F.C.

History
During his reserve duty in the IDF, Maccabi Neve Sha'anan player Eldad Regev was abducted by Hezbollah forces. From that moment on, the club printed on its shirts, "Eldad, we're waiting for you on the pitch." In his honour, the club is considering changing its name to Maccabi Eldad Haifa and out of respect of Regev's father, a religious Jew, they will move all games to Fridays before the Jewish Sabbath.

Club Officials

Coaching Staff
 Manager: Yosef Shriki

Front Office
 Club Official: Eli Dahan
 Club Official: Eli Hadadi
 Club Official: Moshe Birnbaum
 Club Official: Dini Ben-Simon

References

External links
Maccabi Neve Sha'anan Eldad Israel Football Association website 

Football clubs in Haifa
Neve Sha'anan Eldad
Neve Sha'anan Eldad
Association football clubs established in 1965
1965 establishments in Israel